Ilona Ács (later Zimmermann; April 18, 1920 – November 2, 1976) was a Hungarian freestyle swimmer who competed in the 1936 Summer Olympics.

She was born and died in Budapest.

In 1936 she was a member of the Hungarian relay team which finished fourth in the 4 x 100 metre freestyle relay event. In the 100 metre freestyle competition she was eliminated in the first round.

External links
profile

Olympic swimmers of Hungary
Swimmers at the 1936 Summer Olympics
1920 births
1976 deaths
Hungarian female freestyle swimmers
Swimmers from Budapest
20th-century Hungarian women